Catesby's snail-eater (Dipsas catesbyi), also commonly known as Catesby's snail sucker, is a nocturnal species of nonvenomous snake in the family Colubridae. The species is native to northern South America.

Etymology
The specific name, catesbyi, is in honor of English naturalist Mark Catesby.

Geographic range
D. catesbyi is found in Bolivia, Brazil, Guyana, Colombia, Ecuador, French Guiana, Peru, Suriname, and Venezuela.

Habitat

Diet
D. catesbyi, like all species in the genus Dipsas, preys on arboreal land snails and slugs.

Reproduction
D. catesbyi is oviparous.

References

Further reading
Boulenger GA (1896). Catalogue of the Snakes in the British Museum (Natural History). Volume III., Containing the Colubridæ (Opisthoglyphæ and Proteroglyphæ), ... London: Trustees of the British Museum (Natural History). (Taylor and Francis, printers). xiv + 727 pp. + Plates I-XXV. (Leptognathus catesbyi, pp. 449–450).
Freiberg M (1982). Snakes of South America. Hong Kong: T.F.H. Publications. 189 pp. . (Dipsas catesbyi, p. 93).
Marciano-Júnior E, Mira-Mendes CV, Dias IR, Oliveira FFR, Drummond LO (2015). "Dipsas catesbyi (Catesby's Snail-eater). Defensive Behavior". Herpetological Review 46 (4): 643.
Jan G, Sordelli F (1870). Iconographie générale des Ophidiens, Trente-septième livraison. Paris: Baillière. Index + Plates I-VI. (Leptognathus catesbyi, Plate II, figure 2). (in French).
Sentzen UJ (1796). "Ophiologische Fragmente, 6. Beschreibung des  Coluber Catesbeji". Meyer's Zoologische Archives 2: 66-74.  (Coluber catesbeji, new species). (in German).
Zug, George R.; Hedges, S. Blair; Sunkel, Sara (1979). "Variation in Reproductive Parameters of Three Neotropical Snakes, Coniophanes fissidens, Dipsas catesbyi, and Imantodes cenchoa". Smithsonian Contributions to Zoology (300): 1–20.

External links
Images
 Image eating a snail
 Image

Colubrids
catesbyi
Snakes of South America
Reptiles of Bolivia
Reptiles of Brazil
Reptiles of Colombia
Reptiles of Ecuador
Reptiles of French Guiana
Reptiles of Guyana
Reptiles of Peru
Reptiles of Suriname
Reptiles of Venezuela
Reptiles described in 1796